The 2016 CS Autumn Classic International was a figure skating competition held from September 28 – October 1, 2016 at the Sportsplexe Pierrefonds in Montreal, Quebec. It was part of the 2016–17 ISU Challenger Series. Medals were awarded in the disciplines of men's singles, ladies' singles, pair skating, and ice dancing. The host city was announced in April 2016.

Entries

Withdrew before starting orders drawn
 Men: Brendan Kerry (AUS), Bela Papp (FIN)
 Ladies: Sonia Lafuente (ESP)

Added
 Men: Jordan Dodds (AUS)

Results

Men

Ladies

Pairs

Ice dancing

References

External links
 
 2016 CS Autumn Classic International at the International Skating Union

CS Autumn Classic International
2016 in Canadian sports
Sports competitions in Montreal
Autumn Classic International
2016 in Quebec